Database Software may refer to:

 Database software, an alternative capitalisation used to refer to software used to manage a database
 Europress, A company previously trading under the name Database Software